Kenwood is an unincorporated community in Knox County, in the U.S. state of Missouri.

History
Kenwood was founded in 1889, and named after a railroad official. A post office called Kenwood was established in 1890, and remained in operation until 1936.

References

Unincorporated communities in Knox County, Missouri
Unincorporated communities in Missouri